Fridolf Lundsten (26 July 1884 – 5 January 1947) was a Finnish wrestler. He competed at the 1912 Summer Olympics and the 1924 Summer Olympics.

References

External links
 

1884 births
1947 deaths
Olympic wrestlers of Finland
Wrestlers at the 1912 Summer Olympics
Wrestlers at the 1924 Summer Olympics
Finnish male sport wrestlers
People from Raseborg
Sportspeople from Uusimaa